Cuterebra latifrons is a species of new world skin bot fly in the family Oestridae.

References

Oestridae
Articles created by Qbugbot
Insects described in 1898